The Royal Book of Oz (1921) is the fifteenth in the series of Oz books, and the first to be written after L. Frank Baum's death. Although Baum was credited as the author, it was written entirely by Ruth Plumly Thompson. Beginning in the 1980s, some editions have correctly credited Thompson, although the cover of the 2001 edition by Dover Publications credits only Baum.  The original introduction claimed that the book was based on notes by Baum, but this has been disproven.  Supposedly based on Baum's surviving notes, known as "An Oz Book"  are known from four typewritten pages found at his publisher's, but their authenticity as Baum's work has been disputed.  Even if genuine, they are tied to John Dough and the Cherub and bear no resemblance to Thompson's book.

Plot summary

The Scarecrow is upset when Professor Woggle-bug tells him that he has no family, so he goes back to the corn-field where Dorothy Gale found him to trace his "roots." When he fails to return, Dorothy and the Cowardly Lion set out to search for him.  They meet an elderly knight, Sir Hokus of Pokes.  They also meet the Doubtful Dromedary and the Comfortable Camel.  Together, they have several curious adventures while searching for the Scarecrow.

In this novel the Scarecrow discovers that, in a previous incarnation, he was human.  More specifically, he was the Emperor of the Silver Islands, a kingdom located deep underground beneath the Munchkin region of Oz, inhabited by people who resemble Chinese people. When Dorothy first discovered the Scarecrow (in The Wonderful Wizard of Oz) he was hanging from a beanpole in a cornfield; it now develops that this pole descends deep underground to the Silver Islands.  The Emperor of the Silver Islands had been transformed into a crocus by an enemy magician; this magical crocus had sprouted and grown into the beanpole all the way up to the surface of the earth.  When the farmer placed his scarecrow on the beanpole, the spirit of the transformed Emperor entered the Scarecrow's body, causing him to come to life.

The Scarecrow digs at the base of the beanpole and slides down the beanpole to the Silver Islands.  The islanders hail him as the Emperor, returned to save his people.  After spending some time in his former kingdom ruling the quarrelsome Silver Islanders, the Scarecrow decides to return to Oz and continue his carefree existence there.  The islanders, however, are reluctant to let him go, and plot to change him back into his human form, an 85-year-old man.  Dorothy and her party reach the Silver Islands, rescue the Scarecrow from the islanders, and accompany him back to the Emerald City.  Sir Hokus, the Comfortable Camel, and the Doubtful Dromedary become residents of the Emerald City.

Sir Hokus and the Comfortable Camel return as principal characters in The Yellow Knight of Oz.

References

External links

 

 On The Royal Book of Oz
 Tor.com review/discussion of The Royal Book of Oz

Oz (franchise) books
1921 American novels
1921 fantasy novels
1921 children's books
Books about lions